Brooklyn Bridge is the eponymous debut album from the American band The Brooklyn Bridge. It was released in 1968 by Buddah Records.

Track listing
"Blessed Is the Rain" (Tony Romeo) – 3:16
"Welcome Me Love" (Romeo) – 2:20
"Which Way to Nowhere" (Jimmy Webb) – 3:25
"Free as the Wind" (Sal Trimachi, Sandra Kane) – 2:39
"Glad She's a Woman" (Bodie Chandler) – (2:55)
"Space Odyssey-2001 (Thus Spake Zarathustra)" (Richard Strauss) – 1:20
"Requiem" (Webb) – 3:47
"I've Been Lonely Too Long" (Felix Cavaliere/Eddie Brigati) – 3:02
"The Worst That Could Happen" (Webb) – 3:02
"Piece of My Heart" – Bert Berns, Jerry Ragovoy – 3:05
"Your Kite, My Kite" (Romeo) - 3:32

Personnel

Brooklyn Bridge
 Johnny Maestro – lead vocals
 Richie Macioce – guitar
 Jimmy Rosica – bass guitar
 Carolyn Wood – organ
 Artie Cantanzarita – drums
 Joe Ruvio – saxophone
 Shelly Davis – trumpet, piano
 Fred Ferrara, Les Cauchi, Mike Gregorio – vocals

Technical
 Wes Farrell – producer
 Harry Yarmark, Roy Cicala – engineers
 Tommy Sullivan – saxophone arrangements
 Acy R. Lehman – art direction
 Mark English – cover art
 Silver & Morris, Inc. – cover
 Neil Bogart – liner notes

References

1968 debut albums
Johnny Maestro & the Brooklyn Bridge albums
Buddah Records albums